Katsuhiko Sakuma (born 2 February 1970) is a Japanese weightlifter. He competed in the men's bantamweight event at the 1992 Summer Olympics.

References

1970 births
Living people
Japanese male weightlifters
Olympic weightlifters of Japan
Weightlifters at the 1992 Summer Olympics
Sportspeople from Tokyo